Qaleh-ye Mohammad Zia (also Romanized as Qal‘eh-ye Moḩammad Ẕīā’; also known as Qal‘eh Maziyād and Qal‘eh-ye Mazīād) is a village in Darreh Seydi Rural District, in the Central District of Borujerd County, Lorestan Province, Iran. At the 2006 census, its population was 157, in 37 families.

References 

Towns and villages in Borujerd County